Bell Street may refer to:

Roads and streets
State (Bell/Springvale) Highway in Melbourne, Victoria, Australia

Public transit
Ipswich railway station, Queensland, also known as Bell Street bus station

Other uses
Bell Street Park in Seattle, Washington, United States
Bell Street Pier in Seattle, Washington, United States
Bell Street Chapel in Providence, Rhode Island, United States
Bell Street United Church in Ottawa, Ontario, Canada
Jongno in Seoul, South Korea, Literally 'Bell Street'